Arla may refer to:
 Arla (moth), a genus of moth
 Arkansas Library Association
 Arla, Greece, a village 
 Ärla, a village in south-eastern Sweden
 Arla Foods, a large Scandinavian producer of dairy products 
 Arla (Finland), a subsidiary of Arla Foods
 Arla Foods UK, a subsidiary of Arla Foods
 ARLA, Armée révolutionnaire de libération de l'Azawad (French), Revolutionary Liberation Army of Azawad
 Association of Residential Letting Agents in the UK